Thomas Hinchcliffe (6 December 1913 – 1978) was a professional footballer, who played for Grimsby Town, Huddersfield Town & Derby County. He was born in Denaby, near Conisbrough, Yorkshire.

References

1913 births
1978 deaths
People from Conisbrough
Footballers from Doncaster
English footballers
Association football midfielders
English Football League players
Grimsby Town F.C. players
Huddersfield Town A.F.C. players
Derby County F.C. players
Nottingham Forest F.C. players